In mathematics, a conserved quantity of a dynamical system is a function of the dependent variables, the value of which remains constant along each trajectory of the system.

Not all systems have conserved quantities, and conserved quantities are not unique, since one can always produce another such quantity by applying a suitable function, such as adding a constant, to a conserved quantity.

Since many laws of physics express some kind of conservation, conserved quantities commonly exist in mathematical models of physical systems. For example, any classical mechanics model will have mechanical energy as a conserved quantity as long as the forces involved are conservative.

Differential equations

For a first order system of differential equations

where bold indicates vector quantities, a scalar-valued function H(r) is a conserved quantity of the system if, for all time and initial conditions in some specific domain,

Note that by using the multivariate chain rule,

so that the definition may be written as

which contains information specific to the system and can be helpful in finding conserved quantities, or establishing whether or not a conserved quantity exists.

Hamiltonian mechanics 

For a system defined by the Hamiltonian , a function f of the generalized coordinates q and generalized momenta p has time evolution

and hence is conserved if and only if . Here  denotes the Poisson bracket.

Lagrangian mechanics 

Suppose a system is defined by the Lagrangian L with generalized coordinates q. If L has no explicit time dependence (so ), then the energy E defined by

is conserved.

Furthermore, if , then q is said to be a cyclic coordinate and the generalized momentum p defined by

is conserved. This may be derived by using the Euler–Lagrange equations.

See also
 Conservative system
 Lyapunov function
 Hamiltonian system
 Conservation law
 Noether's theorem
 Charge (physics)
 Invariant (physics)

References

Differential equations
Dynamical systems